Matzen is town in the commune of Matzen-Raggendorf in Austria.

Matzen may also refer to:

Matzen oil field in Austria
Schloss Matzen Castle in (Reith im Alpbachtal)  Tyrol, Austria
Matzen-Raggendorf in Niederösterreich
Henning Matzen, (1840–1910) Danish politician